This list ranks high-rises in the Argentine capital of Buenos Aires. The tallest structure in the city is the Alvear Tower, which rises  and was completed in 2017.

Most of the city's skyscrapers are located in the Puerto Madero barrio, one of the city wards that make up Buenos Aires' microcentro. Recent years have seen an increase in high-rises in the city; the tallest building not completed before 2000 is the Le Parc Tower, the ninth-tallest as of 2023.

Tallest buildings

See also
List of tallest buildings in Argentina

References

Tallest in Buenos Aires
Buenos Aires
Buildings and structures in Buenos Aires